Sukhvor-e Namdar-e Mirzapur (also Romanized as Sūkhvor-e Nāmdār-e Mīrzāpūr, Sūkhūr-e Nāmdār-e Mīrzāpūr, and Sūkhvor Nāmdār Mīrzāpūr) is a village in Heydariyeh Rural District, Govar District, Gilan-e Gharb County, Kermanshah Province, Iran. At the 2006 census, its population was 225, in 40 families.

References 

Populated places in Gilan-e Gharb County